Gabriel Popa (born 4 March 1977) is a Romanian bobsledder. He competed in the four man event at the 2006 Winter Olympics.

References

1977 births
Living people
Romanian male bobsledders
Olympic bobsledders of Romania
Bobsledders at the 2006 Winter Olympics
Sportspeople from Bucharest